The United Nations Educational, Scientific and Cultural Organization (UNESCO) World Heritage Sites are places of importance to cultural or natural heritage as described in the UNESCO World Heritage Convention, established in 1972. Switzerland ratified the convention on 17 September 1975, making its natural and cultural sites eligible for inclusion on the list. 

, there are thirteen properties in Switzerland inscribed on the World Heritage List, nine of which are cultural sites and four are natural sites. The first three sites were added to the list in 1983: Old City of Berne, Abbey of Saint Gall, and Benedictine Abbey of St. John at Müstair. The most recent addition were the two forests added to the Ancient and Primeval Beech Forests of the Carpathians and Other Regions of Europe site in 2021. Five sites are shared with other countries. The Rhaetian Railway and Monte San Giorgio are shared with Italy, Prehistoric pile dwellings around the Alps with five countries, The Architectural Work of Le Corbusier with six countries, and the Ancient and Primeval Beech Forests with 17 countries. There is one site on the tentative list. 



World Heritage Sites 
UNESCO lists sites under ten criteria; each entry must meet at least one of the criteria. Criteria i through vi are cultural, and vii through x are natural.

Tentative list 
In addition to the sites inscribed on the World Heritage list, member states can maintain a list of tentative sites that they may consider for nomination. Nominations for the World Heritage list are only accepted if the site has previously been listed on the tentative list. , Switzerland had one site on its tentative list.

See also
Swiss Inventory of Cultural Property of National and Regional Significance
Lists of tourist attractions in Switzerland

References

 List
Switzerland
World Heritage Sites